Central subway may refer to:

 Central subway (Boston), the system of tunnels used by the MBTA Green Line
 Central Subway (San Francisco), a light rail tunnel used by Muni Metro’s T Third Street Line
 Central Link, now known as the 1 Line, a light rail line running between the cities of Seattle and SeaTac, part of Sound Transit's Link light rail system
 Sha Tin to Central Link, a heavy rail expansion project of the MTR in Hong Kong

See also 
 Central link (disambiguation)
 Central line (disambiguation)